La Couronne is a commune in the Charente department in southwestern France.

The commune lies to the southwest of Angoulême.
Jean-Edmond Laroche-Joubert (1820–1884) was born in La Couronne.
He established two modern paper manufacturing plants in La Couronne, L’Escalier and Girac, where he installed second-generation machines almost 12 metres (39 ft) long making sheets of paper 1.25 to 1.5 metres (4 ft 1 in to 4 ft 11 in) wide.

Population

See also
Communes of the Charente department

References

Communes of Charente
Charente communes articles needing translation from French Wikipedia